XHEOLA-FM (branded as La Huasteca) is a Mexican Spanish-language FM radio station located in Tampico, Tamaulipas. The frequency is 103.5 MHz.

History
XEJT-AM 1460 received its concession on August 20, 1960. It was owned by Carlos Zárate Urbina and broadcast with 1,000 watts. By 1966, Música Radiofónica, S.A., had bought the station. The callsign was changed to XEOLA-AM in the 1970s. In the 1990s, XEOLA moved to 710 kHz; it was cleared to move to FM in 2011.

On April 28, 2018, XHEOLA-FM moved from 107.9 to 103.5 MHz. The frequency change was a requirement of its 2017 concession renewal, so as to clear 106-108 MHz for community and indigenous stations.

External links
 
 
 radiostationworld.com List of radio stations in Tamaulipas

References

Radio stations in Tampico